William Allen Blair (born December 18, 1965) is an American former right-handed pitcher in Major League Baseball and current pitching coach for the West Michigan Whitecaps.

Playing career
Blair played baseball for Morehead State University before the Toronto Blue Jays drafted him in the 11th round of the 1986 amateur draft. He spent four seasons in the Blue Jays minor league system, playing for the St. Catharines Blue Jays (1986), the Dunedin Blue Jays (1987–1988), the Knoxville Smokies (1988), and the Syracuse Chiefs (1989).

Blair made his major league debut with the Blue Jays on April 11, 1990, and spent the season with the major league squad. He was traded in the offseason to the Cleveland Indians for Alex Sanchez, and played in 11 games for the Indians that year. Blair was then traded to the Houston Astros with Eddie Taubensee for Kenny Lofton and Dave Rohde. After a season with Houston, he was picked up by the Colorado Rockies in their expansion draft. After the Rockies (1993–1994), he played for the San Diego Padres (1995–1996), Detroit Tigers (1997, 1999–2001), Arizona Diamondbacks (1998), and New York Mets (1998).

His best year was 1997, in which he had 16–8 record and an earned run average (ERA) of 4.17. In 1999, Blair was the starting pitcher for the final Opening Day in Tiger Stadium history.

Coaching career
He was the pitching coach for the Fort Wayne TinCaps for the 2011 and 2012 seasons, and on December 11, 2012, he was named bullpen coach of the San Diego Padres, replacing Jimmy Jones.

On December 2, 2015, Blair was named the pitching coach for the Double-A Erie SeaWolves. He was transferred to the Single-A Whitecaps in December 2018.

Blair currently lives in Richmond, Kentucky.

References

External links

Pelota Binaria (Venezuelan Winter League)

1965 births
Living people
American expatriate baseball players in Canada
Arizona Diamondbacks players
Baseball coaches from Kentucky
Baseball players from Kentucky
Buffalo Bisons (minor league) players
Cardenales de Lara players
American expatriate baseball players in Venezuela
Cleveland Indians players
Colorado Rockies players
Colorado Springs Sky Sox players
Detroit Tigers players
Dunedin Blue Jays players
Houston Astros players
Knoxville Blue Jays players
Major League Baseball bullpen coaches
Major League Baseball pitchers
Minor league baseball coaches
Morehead State Eagles baseball players
People from Paintsville, Kentucky
San Diego Padres coaches
San Diego Padres players
New York Mets players
St. Catharines Blue Jays players
Syracuse Chiefs players
Toledo Mud Hens players
Toronto Blue Jays players
Tucson Toros players
West Michigan Whitecaps players